Megalachne is a genus of Chilean plants in the grass family, found only on the Juan Fernández Islands in the Pacific Ocean, part of the Republic of Chile. A genetic analysis found it to be most closely related to the extinct Podophorus, also endemic to the Juan Fernández archipelago. This clade was in turn found to be nested within a paraphyletic Festuca, most closely related to F. pampeana of South America.

 Species
 Megalachne berteroniana Steud.  
 Megalachne masafuerana (Pilg.) Matthei

 formerly included
see Eriachne 
 Megalachne zeylanica - syn  of Eriachne triseta

References

Endemic flora of the Juan Fernández Islands
Poaceae genera
Pooideae